Esme Olivia Burge (born 15 May 1999) is an English field hockey player who plays as a midfielder for Hampstead & Westminster and the England and Great Britain national teams.

Club career
Burge plays club hockey in Women's England Hockey League for Hampstead & Westminster.

She has also played hockey for University of Nottingham  and Beeston.

International career
Burge made her senior international debut for Great Britain against Germany on 7 June 2019.

She made her senior international debut for England against Italy on 6 June 2021, in the EuroHockey Championship 2021 Women.

References

External links
Profile on England Hockey
Profile on Great Britain Hockey

1999 births
Living people
English female field hockey players
Women's England Hockey League players
Female field hockey midfielders
Hampstead & Westminster Hockey Club players